Lucius Coleman Hall House is a historic home located near Webster, Jackson County, North Carolina. The house was built in 1891–1892, and is a -story, Late Victorian-style frame dwelling, with a -story rear ell. The rear ell is believed to date to about 1850, and originated as a free-standing, saddlebag house with gable roof and central brick chimney. The 1892 section is a "T"-plan, I-house with elaborate details.  The hipped roof porch on the 1892 section was added about 1950.

It was listed on the National Register of Historic Places in 1990.

References

Houses on the National Register of Historic Places in North Carolina
Victorian architecture in North Carolina
Houses completed in 1892
Houses in Jackson County, North Carolina
National Register of Historic Places in Jackson County, North Carolina